Uphall Station is a village located in West Lothian, Scotland. The name is derived from the neighbouring town Uphall on account of the railway station located on the northeast perimeter of the village. The village is situated southeast of Uphall and Broxburn, north of Pumpherston and northeast of Livingston. It lies approximately a quarter of a mile from the A89, which is a major road running between Greenock in the west of Scotland and Edinburgh in the east of Scotland. A gala day (an outdoor fête) is held annually, usually in June.

Uphall railway station

Housing
Uphall Station has a variety of housing, including old Victorian and Edwardian stone-built cottages, modern housing estates, bungalows and cottages. The cottages were built during the mining days of Uphall Station to house the large mining community, since each property has been extended in different ways, every property is unique and house prices vary. Some cottages have low maintenance yards whilst others have very large (3000sqft/ 300sqm) back gardens. Houses in the area have recently sold for over £300,000 with the new Dundas Estate houses selling for between £250,000 and over £300,000.

Natural landscape
Uphall Station encompasses a nationally significant population of protected Great Crested Newts, thought to be to third largest breeding site in Scotland.
The site, to the North East of the main thoroughfare of Pumpherston Road, is also home to badgers, wild roe deer, foxes, Soprano pipistrelle bats, 17 species of rare and at danger bird species including Grey partridge, yellowhammers, Skylarks and birds of prey. In all, the area is home to over a 100 species of animals and many species of wild flowers. The area is open access and currently utilized as arable farmland as well as a training ground for local amphibian welfare charities due to its highly accessible nature by road and rail.

Crime levels
Uphall Station has a relatively low crime rate compared with the rest of West Lothian and is therefore considered a safe place to raise children. According to Police Scotland, West Lothian has a much lower than average crime and offense rate which is lower than every city in Scotland, including a crime rate nearly 30% lower than Edinburgh, 64% lower than Glasgow and a third lower than Falkirk.

Dishonesty crimes in West Lothian are half that of Edinburgh and violent crime is 72% lower than that of Glasgow. This is possibly attributed to the numerous neighbourhood watch schemes in the area and the number of affluent commuters who reside in the village.

Services
Uphall Station has a population of around 1,026 residents; Uphall Station has a significant proportion of commuters to Edinburgh due to its reputation as a safe commuter village with exceptional links to Edinburgh, Glasgow and other parts of West Lothian through Scotrail, M8 motorway, Lothian Country Buses and McGill's Eastern Scottish buses.

There are numerous local taxi companies which can take you to Livingston, Edinburgh airport and Edinburgh as well as further afield.

Public transport
Chartered bus services depart frequently. These are operated by McGill's Eastern Scottish. Timetables can be viewed online at the McGill's Scotland East website 

Lothian Country Buses formerly served the area from 2018 offering another bus route to Edinburgh and Livingston from Pumpherston Road.  Lothian Country Buses stopped serving the area in November 2022.

Uphall rail station is exceptionally popular with Edinburgh commuters with up to four trains an hour from 6am until midnight and the journey taking less than 20 minutes to reach the heart of Edinburgh. Commutes to Glasgow are also popular due to the reliable service every 15 minutes.

Uphall Station is also ideally situated for Edinburgh Airport which is a short drive or taxi ride away.

Amenities
Within Uphall Station, shops and services include: a small supermarket, local pub with pool and darts hall, a hairdresser salon, a bowling club and an Thai restaurant. West Lothian Council operates a mobile library service as it lies outside the one-mile threshold of a local library.

Uphall Station is adjacent to a large country park which houses a variety of local animals including deer, birds of prey, endangered great crested newts and other nesting birds.

Within a five-minute walk lies a popular Indian restaurant, Scotmid, another corner shop, upscale golf club with dining facilities and two Chinese takeaways.

References

1.  http://www.firstgroup.com/ukbus/scotland/sescot/search/resultsindex.php?results=889515,88953

External links

Museum of the Scottish shale industry - Uphall Station Rows and Office Rows
 http://www.gov.scot/Publications/2015/09/5338/downloads

Villages in West Lothian